Scyphocephalium is a genus of plants in family Myristicaceae native to west Africa, containing two species. One species contains chemicals with significant in vitro antibacterial activity.

Species 
Scyphocephalium mannii (Benth. & Hook.f.) Warb. - Cameroon to Gabon

Scyphocephalium ochocoa Warb. - Equatorial Guinea and Gabon

References

Myristicaceae genera